Raymonde Naigre (born 23 January 1960 in Les Abymes, Guadeloupe) is a French athlete who specialises in the 200 meters and the 100 meter relay. Naigre competed at the 1980 Summer Olympics and 1984 Summer Olympics.

References 
  sports reference

French female sprinters
Olympic athletes of France
French people of Guadeloupean descent
Guadeloupean female sprinters
Living people
People from Les Abymes
Athletes (track and field) at the 1980 Summer Olympics
Athletes (track and field) at the 1984 Summer Olympics
Mediterranean Games gold medalists for France
Athletes (track and field) at the 1983 Mediterranean Games
Mediterranean Games medalists in athletics
1960 births
Olympic female sprinters